Araki-ryū (荒木流) is a Japanese koryū martial art founded during the Sengoku jidai by Araki Mujinsai Minamoto no Hidenawa (荒木夢仁斎源秀縄). Araki-ryu is a comprehensive system that specializes in the use and application of many traditional Japanese weapons such as spear, glaive, long and short sword, staff, rope, chain and sickle, and torite-kogusoku (grappling in light armor with weapons).

Introduction 

Araki Ryu was founded in the Tensho period, approximately 1573. Its creation is attributed to Araki Mujinsai (or Muninsai) Minamoto no Hidetsuna. Torite-kogusoku techniques are the central focus of the martial tradition. Through an examination of the records of over forty lines of Araki-ryu, almost all emanate from the 2nd generation Mori Kasuminosuke. Araki Ryu spread quite widely throughout Japan: traditionally, upon receiving a teaching license, one established one's own independent dojo or line. Nonetheless, those separate lines maintained the same central set of grappling techniques.

Currently, the central line of this martial tradition is located in Isezaki village in Japan, started by 9th generation shihan Komine Bundayu, and his student, Kurihara Iomji Masashige. The Isezaki line has preserved much of the original curriculum, though there is no way of knowing how close its current expression is to the original version. The Isezaki line focuses on an emphasis on grappling with weaponry. They also have numerous weapon-on-weapon kata, most likely developed through exchanges among the martial traditions of the area, most notably Kashima Shinden Jikishinkage-ryū and Kiraku-ryu.

The founder: Araki Mujinsai Minamoto no Hidetsuna (荒木夢仁斎源秀縄) 

In the Honcho Bugei Shoden (pub. 1711–1715 CE), there is a passage that states, "No one knows where Araki Mujinsai is from, and little is known of his deeds, yet his excellent techniques in torite are renowned." Some lines of Araki-ryu speculate that he is from the family of the warlord Araki Murashige, who served as a general under Oda Nobunaga, but there is absolutely no documentary evidence to that assertion.

Oral tradition of the ryuha asserts that Araki Mujinsai fought in the Chosen no Eki [war with Korea] and received praise from Hideyoshi, from whom he received the title, Nihon Kaizan, literally "Japan's opener of mountains." 

Common to all lines of Araki-ryû that descended through Mori Kasumi is the story which tells of the formation of the school. In Araki-ryû torite saitan no jo (The rebirth of Araki-ryû), a text allegedly written by Araki Mujinsai, he refers to Fujiwara no Katsumi as the founder of the school.  (NOTE: Although there is no definitive proof, there is some historical evidence within the annals of Takenouchi-ryu that Fujiwara Katsumi studied with the founder of Takenouchi-ryu, Takenouchi Hisamori, and that this may be a pseudonym for Miyamoto Munisai, the father of Miyamoto Musashi.

In this text, it asserts that Katsumi like so many other founders of martial traditions before and after him, went to a mountain shrine, in Fujiwara's case, Atagoyama Dai Gongen, praying unceasingly [Atogodaiyama is a shrine in Kyoto prefecture under the auspices of a mountain elemental, a tengu Tarōbō daimyogi (太郎坊) of Mount Atago. After one hundred days of austerities, Fujiwara became, "enlightened into the mysteries of combat, and from that time forward, it became easy for him to defeat the strongest men throughout Japan." The text continues, however, that, "he became lost in folly, and ceasing to love the art for itself, came only to care about winning. He acquired a filthy name." This of course refers to the hubris which can result from power coupled with an absence of the ethical center upon which power should be built, which was requisite in all bujutsu ryuha. Though not written in this text, it is implied that either he regained his bearings and became a moral individual, or that this was the renaissance that the putative writer, Araki Munjinsai accomplished. This text is rather unique among martial art origin stories in its recognition of the intoxication of power.

Modern times 
Araki-ryû was maintained in many areas of Japan, but by the 20th century, most lines became extinct. There are three remaining lines in Japan.
 Two factions of Araki Ryu located in Isezaki, maintained by Kikuchi Kunimitsu and Suzuki Seiichiro. Although they chose to maintain their own dojo and separate administration, they are fundamentally the same. Araki-ryu was designated a cultural treasure of Isezaki in 1967
 Araki-ryu gunyo-kogusoku, a tradition descending from Araki Buzaemon, quite distinct in many respects from the Isezaki Araki-ryu, but also sharing many elements in common.
 Araki Mujinsai-ryu iaido – there are several factions of this group which exclusively practices sword drawing. Other than claiming the same founder, there is no apparent relationship in either technique or the names of the kata within the curriculum.

References

External links
Araki ryu Kenpo
Nippon Meirinkai (Araki-ryu iai)

Ko-ryū bujutsu
Japanese martial arts